Isaac Stephen Mabiletsa is a Botswanan politician who served as the assistant speaker of the 10th Parliament of Botswana representing Kgatleng East for the Botswana National Front (2010–2012) and Botswana Congress Party (2012–2014), the latter of which he helped to found.

In 2015, Mabiletsa received additional media attention when his younger brother, Ndaba, was prosecuted for the murder of their 85 year-old mother in Morwa.

References

Botswana politicians
Year of birth missing (living people)
Living people